, also known by his stage names Violent Onsen Geisha and Hair Stylistics, is a Japanese musician, writer and actor. He was described by Allmusic as "one of those musical entities that defy categorization." He co-starred in Shinji Aoyama's 2005 film My God, My God, Why Hast Thou Forsaken Me? with Tadanobu Asano.

Discography

Violent Onsen Geisha
 Excrete Music (1991)
 Otis (1993)
 Que Sera, Sera (1995)
 Black Lovers: Early Lost Tapes 1988 (1995)
 The Midnight Gambler (1996)
 Nation of Rhythm Slaves (1996)
 Teenage Pet Sounds (1996)

Hair Stylistics
 1996–1999 (2001)
 Custom Cock Confused Death (2004)
 AM 5:00+ (2007)
 Expanded Pussies (2009)
 Live! (2009)
 Live: Album (2010)

Guest appearances
 Jim O'Rourke – "After the Fox" from All Kinds of People: Love Burt Bacharach (2010)

Remixes
 Cornelius – "Volunteer Ape Man (Disco)" from 96/69 (1996)
 Hanayo – "Makka na Shizuku" from Sayonalala (1996)
 Microstoria – "Endless Summer NAMM" from Reprovisers (1997)

Bibliography
 Mari & Fifi's Massacre Songbook (2001)
 Bouquets of Flowers Everywhere (2001)
 Naughty Manifesto of the Futurist Kids (2004)
 The Nameless Orphans' Grave (2006)
 KKK Bestseller (2006)
 Less than IQ84! (2010)

Filmography
 My God, My God, Why Hast Thou Forsaken Me? (2005)

References

External links
 
 J'Lit | Authors : Masaya Nakahara | Books from Japan 

1970 births
Living people
Japanese male actors
Japanese writers
Musicians from Tokyo
Yukio Mishima Prize winners